A list of notable Polish politicians of the Civic Platform Party.

A
 Łukasz Abgarowicz
 Paweł Adamowicz
 Robert Ambroziewicz
 Paweł Arndt
 Urszula Augustyn
 Tadeusz Aziewicz

B
 Aleksandra Banasiak
 Radosław Baran
 Józef Berger
 Jan Krzysztof Bielecki
 Marek Biernacki
Mateusz Bochenek
 Krystyna Bochenek
 Bogdan Bojko
 Michał Boni
 Bogdan Borusewicz
 Krzysztof Brejza
 Rafał Bruski
 Beata Bublewicz
 Jerzy Budnik
 Bożenna Bukiewicz
 Mirosław Bulzacki
 Jerzy Buzek

C
 Piotr Całbecki
 Zbigniew Chlebowski
 Stanisław Chmielewski
 Zdzisław Chmielewski
 Janusz Chwierut
 Piotr Cybulski
 Andrzej Czerwiński
 Tomasz Czubak
 Andrzej Czuma

D
 Grzegorz Dolniak
 Ludwik Dorn
 Mirosław Drzewiecki
 Jarosław Duda
 Waldy Dzikowski
 Janusz Dzięcioł

F
 Joanna Fabisiak
 Jerzy Fedorowicz
 Czesław Fiedorowicz

G
 Urszula Gacek
 Krzysztof Gadowski
 Stanisław Gawłowski
 Andrzej Gałażewski
 Elżbieta Gelert
 Zyta Gilowska
 John Godson
 Stanisław Gorczyca
 Jarosław Gowin
 Andrzej Maria Gołaś
 Cezary Grabarczyk
 Aleksander Grad
 Paweł Graś
 Hanna Gronkiewicz-Waltz
 Maciej Grubski
 Rafał Grupiński
 Krzysztof Grzegorek
 Andrzej Gut-Mostowy
 Tomasz Głogowski

H
 Aleksander Hall
 Małgorzata Handzlik
 Jolanta Hibner
 Krzysztof Hołowczyc
 Danuta Hübner

I
 Stanisław Iwan

J
 Tadeusz Jarmuziewicz
 Danuta Jazłowiecka
 Stanisław Jałowiecki
 Michał Joachimowski
 Sidonia Jędrzejewska

K
 Filip Kaczmarek
 Krzysztof Kamiński
 Sebastian Karpiniuk
 Włodzimierz Karpiński
 Małgorzata Kidawa-Błońska
 Leon Kieres
 Kazimierz Kleina
 Bogdan Klich
 Józef Klim
 Ryszard Knosala
 Magdalena Kochan
 Lena Kolarska-Bobińska
 Bronisław Komorowski
 Ewa Kopacz
 Domicela Kopaczewska
 Tadeusz Kopeć
 Leszek Korzeniowski
 Roman Kosecki
 Jerzy Kozdroń
 Mirosław Koźlakiewicz
 Jacek Krupa
 Marian Krzaklewski
 Barbara Kudrycka
 Tomasz Kulesza
 Kazimierz Kutz
 Krzysztof Kwiatkowski

L
 Stanisław Lamczyk
 Tomasz Lenz
 Janusz Lewandowski
 Dariusz Lipiński
 Jacek Lipiński
 Krzysztof Lisek
 Arkadiusz Litwiński
 Roman Ludwiczuk
 Alojzy Lysko

M
 Edward Maniura
 Andrzej Markowiak
 Tadeusz Maćkała
 Beata Małecka-Libera
 Jerzy Miller
 Konstanty Miodowicz
 Tomasz Misiak
 Izabela Mrzygłocka
 Joanna Mucha
 Rafał Muchacki
 Antoni Mężydło
 Aldona Młyńczak

N
 Stefan Niesiołowski
 Sławomir Nitras
 Sławomir Nowak

O
 Stanisława Okularczyk
 Jan Olbrycht
 Alicja Olechowska
 Andrzej Olechowski
 Paweł Olszewski

P
 Zbigniew Pacelt
 Maria Pasło-Wiśniewska
 Andrzej Person
 Antoni Piechniczek
 Sławomir Piechota
 Elżbieta Pierzchała
 Krzysztof Piesiewicz
 Danuta Pietraszewska
 Teresa Piotrowska
 Paweł Piskorski
 Julia Pitera
 Kazimierz Plocke
 Marek Plura
 Jacek Protasiewicz
 Maciej Płażyński

R
 Damian Raczkowski
 Elżbieta Radziszewska
 Józef Ramlau
 Ireneusz Raś
 Marek Rocki
 Małgorzata Rohde
 Jan Rokita
 Nelli Rokita
 Halina Rozpondek
 Jan Rulewski
 Jakub Rutnicki
 Arkadiusz Rybicki
 Sławomir Rybicki
 Zbigniew Rynasiewicz
 Jan Rzymełka

S
 Leszek Samborski
 Jacek Saryusz-Wolski
 Beata Sawicka
 Wojciech Saługa
 Grzegorz Schetyna
 Mirosław Sekuła
 Władysław Sidorowicz
 Henryk Siedlaczek
 Tomasz Siemoniak
 Radosław Sikorski
 Krystyna Skowrońska
 Joanna Skrzydlewska
 Andrzej Smirnow
 Robert Smoktunowicz
 Bogusław Sonik
 Andrzej Sośnierz
 Lidia Staroń
 Michał Stuligrosz
 Brunon Synak
 Waldemar Szadny
 Michał Szczerba
 Tomasz Szczypiński
 Adam Szejnfeld
 Andrzej Szewiński
 Grzegorz Sztolcman
 Jakub Szulc
 Krystyna Szumilas
 Krzysztof Szyga

T
 Róża Thun
 Tomasz Tomczykiewicz
 Tadeusz Truskolaski
 Donald Tusk
 Robert Tyszkiewicz

U
 Jarosław Urbaniak

W
 Piotr Wach
 Jarosław Wałęsa
 Wojciech Wilk
 Ewa Więckowska
 Jacek Wojciechowicz
 Ewa Wolak
 Marek Woźniak
 Eugeniusz Wycisło
 Jan Wyrowiński
 Marek Wójcik

Z
 Jadwiga Zakrzewska
 Zbigniew Zaleski
 Paweł Zalewski
 Krzysztof Zaremba
 Artur Zasada
 Hanna Zdanowska
 Bogdan Zdrojewski
 Anna Zielińska-Głębocka
 Wojciech Ziemniak
 Tadeusz Zwiefka

Ć
 Zbigniew Ćwiąkalski

Ł
 Elżbieta Łukacijewska

Ś
 Iwona Śledzińska-Katarasińska
 Paweł Śpiewak
 Maciej Świątkowski

Ż
 Stanisław Żmijan

 
Civic Platform